Paraliotipoma sirenkoi is a species of small sea snail with calcareous opercula, a marine gastropod mollusk in the family Colloniidae.

Description
The shell reaches a height of 4.2 mm.

Distribution
This marine species occurs off the Chiametan Bank, South China Sea.

References

External links
 To World Register of Marine Species
 

Colloniidae
Gastropods described in 2012